Hemiscolopia is a genus of flowering plants belonging to the family Salicaceae. It contains a single species, Hemiscolopia trimera.

Its native range is Indo-China to Western Malesia.

References

Salicaceae
Salicaceae genera
Monotypic Malpighiales genera